Claire Catherine Danes (born April 12, 1979) is an American actress. Prolific in film and television since her teens, she is the recipient of three Primetime Emmy Awards and four Golden Globe Awards. In 2012, Time named her one of the 100 most influential people in the world.

Danes first gained recognition for starring in the 1994 teen drama series My So-Called Life, winning a Golden Globe Award for Best Actress and receiving a nomination for a Primetime Emmy Award. She made her film debut in the same year in Little Women (1994), and gained wider fame for starring in the romance Romeo + Juliet (1996). Danes has since appeared in The Rainmaker (1997), The Hours (2002), Terminator 3: Rise of the Machines (2003), Shopgirl (2005), and Stardust (2007). She appeared in an Off-Broadway production of The Vagina Monologues in 2000 and made her Broadway debut playing Eliza Doolittle in a 2007 revival of Pygmalion.
 
In 2010, Danes portrayed the title character in the HBO film Temple Grandin for which she won her first Primetime Emmy Award and another Golden Globe. From 2011 to 2020, she starred as Carrie Mathison in the Showtime drama series Homeland, for which she won two Primetime Emmy Awards and two Golden Globe Awards for Best Actress. In 2022, she starred in the FX on Hulu series Fleishman Is in Trouble.

Early life and education 
Danes was born in Manhattan, New York City, the daughter of sculptor and printmaking artist, Carla Danes (née Hall), and photographer Christopher Danes. Her older brother, Asa, is a lawyer. During Danes's childhood, her mother ran a small toddler day care center called "Danes Tribe" out of the family's SoHo loft and later served as Danes's manager. Danes's father worked as a residential general contractor in New York for 20 years in a company he ran called "Overall Construction". He also worked as a photographer and computer consultant. Danes is named after her paternal grandmother, Claire Danes (née Tomowske). Danes describes her ethnic origins as "WASPy as you can get".

The family lived in an artist's loft on Crosby Street. Danes attended P.S. 3 and P.S. 11 for elementary school and Professional Performing Arts School for junior high school. She attended the New York City Lab School for Collaborative Studies in Manhattan. She attended The Dalton School for one year of high school before moving with her parents to Santa Monica, California, for the role in My So-Called Life. They moved two days after the 1994 Northridge earthquake.

Danes graduated from the Lycée Français de Los Angeles in 1997. In 1998, she began studies at Yale University. After studying for two years as a psychology major, she dropped out to focus on her film career.

Acting career 

Danes started studying dance when she was six years old. She took dance classes from Ellen Robbins at Dance Theater Workshop and acting classes at HB Studio the Lee Strasberg Theatre and Film Institute at the age of 10. She appeared in theater and video productions in New York City. Although she continued to dance, Danes said that her focus shifted to acting by the time she was nine years old. Her audition with Miloš Forman when she was 11 led to roles in several student films. She signed with agent Karen Friedman at the Writers & Artists talent agency at age 12.

Television 
At age 13, Danes got her first big job working on the Dudley Moore TV sitcom pilot called Dudley, which was shot at Silvercup Studios in Astoria, Queens. Danes played a teenage murderer in a guest starring role on Law & Order in the season three episode "Skin Deep". She appeared in an episode of HBO's Lifestories: Families in Crisis entitled "The Coming out of Heidi Leiter". In March 1993, a pilot episode was shot, when she was 13 years old. It would be almost another year and a half before broadcast.

She then starred as the 15-year-old Angela Chase in the television drama series My So-Called Life. For her role, she won a Golden Globe Award and received an Emmy nomination. Despite being canceled after only 19 episodes, My So-Called Life has developed a large cult following. In 1995, she starred in the Soul Asylum music video for "Just Like Anyone".

In 2010, Danes starred in the HBO production of Temple Grandin, a biopic about the autistic animal scientist. She won the 2010 Emmy Award for Outstanding Lead Actress in a Miniseries or a Movie, the 2011 Golden Globe Award for Best Actress – Miniseries or Television Film and the 2011 Screen Actors Guild Outstanding Performance by a Female Actor in a Television Movie or Miniseries award. The film was well received and Grandin herself praised Danes's performance.

From 2011 to 2020, Danes starred in the Showtime series Homeland, in which she played Carrie Mathison, an agent of the CIA who has bipolar disorder. She won the 2013 Golden Globe and the 2012 Golden Globe for Best Actress in a Television Series for her performance. She also won the 2012 and 2013 Emmy for Outstanding Lead Actress in a Drama Series for her performance in Homeland. In 2012, Time magazine named Danes one of the 100 most influential people in the world.

On February 10, 2021, it was announced that Danes would helm the Apple drama series The Essex Serpent, replacing Keira Knightley, as Cora Seaborne.

Film

Danes played Beth March in the 1994 film adaptation of Little Women. Although ABC canceled My So-Called Life in 1995, her higher profile led to being cast in several film roles, including 1995's Home for the Holidays and 1996's I Love You, I Love You Not and To Gillian on Her 37th Birthday.

Her first leading role on the big screen came in 1996, when she portrayed Juliet in the film Romeo + Juliet, inspiring director Baz Luhrmann to call her, at age 16, "the Meryl Streep of her generation". Later that year, it was reported that she turned down the female lead role in Titanic.

In 1997, Danes played abused wife Kelly Riker in The Rainmaker, directed by Francis Ford Coppola, as well as Jenny in Oliver Stone's noir U Turn.

In 1998, she played several very different roles: Cosette in Les Misérables, and the pregnant teenage daughter of Polish immigrants in Polish Wedding.

In 1999, she made her first appearance in an animated feature with the English version of Princess Mononoke. That same year, she played the role of Julie Barnes in the big screen adaptation of the 1970s TV show The Mod Squad. She also starred in Brokedown Palace.

Danes left her career temporarily to attend Yale, having made 13 films in five years. In 2002, she returned to film. She starred in Igby Goes Down. Later that year, she co-starred as Clarissa Vaughan's (played by Meryl Streep) daughter in the Oscar-nominated film The Hours. The following year, she was cast in Terminator 3: Rise of the Machines, followed by Stage Beauty in 2004. She earned critical acclaim in 2005 when she starred in Shopgirl and The Family Stone. In 2007, she appeared in the fantasy Stardust, which she described as a "classic model of romantic comedy". In 2007, she appeared in the drama film Evening and the thriller film The Flock. She was also featured in the 2008 film Me and Orson Welles.

Theater
Danes got her start in New York City theater appearing in performances of Happiness, Punk Ballet, and Kids Onstage, for which she choreographed her own dance. In April, 2000, she appeared off Broadway in Eve Ensler's The Vagina Monologues. In November of that same year, she appeared as Emily Webb in a one-night-only staged reading of Thornton Wilder's Our Town at All Saints' Episcopal Church in Beverly Hills. The production was staged by Bess Armstrong, who had played the mother of Danes's character on My So-Called Life.

In September 2005, Danes returned to New York's Performance Space 122, where she had performed as a child. She appeared in choreographer Tamar Rogoff's solo dance piece "Christina Olson: American Model", where she portrayed the subject of Andrew Wyeth's famous painting Christina's World. Olson suffered from muscular deterioration that left her weak and partially paralyzed. Danes was praised for her dance skills and acting in the project.

In January, 2007, Danes performed in Performance Space 122's Edith and Jenny. Later in 2007, Danes made her Broadway theatre debut as Eliza Doolittle in the Roundabout Theatre Company revival of George Bernard Shaw's Pygmalion, directed by David Grindley at the American Airlines Theatre.

In January, 2012, Harvard University's Hasty Pudding Theatricals named Danes their 2012 Woman of the Year.

In March, 2016, Danes performed in Dry Powder by Sarah Burgess at The Public Theater, starring alongside John Krasinski, Hank Azaria and Sanjit De Silva. The play was directed by Thomas Kail.

Other work

In 1995, Danes was the main character of Soul Asylum's music video for the song "Just Like Anyone".

In 1997, Danes wrote an introduction to Neil Gaiman's Death: The Time of Your Life.

In 2012, Danes's audiobook recording of Margaret Atwood's The Handmaid's Tale was released at Audible.com. Her performance won the 2013 Audie Award for fiction.

She hosted the 2013 Nobel Peace Prize Concert in Oslo.

In 2015, Danes was awarded a star on the Hollywood Walk of Fame.

Personal life
Danes has been in therapy since the age of six and considers it "a helpful tool and a luxury to self-reflect and get some insight".

In 1998, Danes was declared persona non grata by Filipino officials. Restrictions imposed on Danes involved a ban from entering Manila or the Philippines and prohibition on distribution of her films in the region. The ban came after Danes said Manila, the capital of the Philippines, "smelled of cockroaches, with rats all over, and that there is no sewage system, and the people do not have anything – no arms, no legs, no eyes". Danes later apologized for those remarks, but they refused to lift the ban.

Danes and her mother are supporters of the charity Afghan Hands, which helps women in Afghanistan gain independence, education, and livable wages. Danes is also a long time supporter of DonorsChoose, a website that allows public school teachers to create project requests.

Danes is a feminist and has been critical of female underrepresentation within Hollywood.

Relationships and family 
Danes met singer Ben Lee at her eighteenth birthday party in 1997. They dated for six years before separating in 2003.

In 2003, Danes began dating actor Billy Crudup, with whom she starred in Stage Beauty. Their relationship attracted significant media attention, as it led to Crudup's break-up with actor Mary-Louise Parker, who was seven months pregnant with their child at the time. Danes and Crudup's relationship lasted until 2006. Reflecting on their relationship, Danes had commented in 2015, "That was a scary thing. It was really hard. I didn't know how to not do that. I was just in love with him, and needed to explore that, and I was 24 ... I didn't quite know what those consequences would be. But it's OK. I went through it."

Danes met actor Hugh Dancy on the set of the film Evening in 2006. They announced their engagement in February 2009 and married in France in a private ceremony later that year. They have two sons, born in 2012 and 2018. Danes revealed on the red carpet at the 80th Golden Globe Awards ceremony that she and Dancy are expecting their third child.

Filmography

Film

Television

Stage

Awards and nominations

Emmy Awards (Primetime) 
The Primetime Emmy Award is American award bestowed by the Academy of Television Arts & Sciences in recognition of excellence in U.S. primetime TV programming.

Golden Globe Awards
The Golden Globe Awards are accolades bestowed by the 93 members of the Hollywood Foreign Press Association, recognizing excellence in film and television, both domestic and foreign.

Screen Actors Guild Awards
The Screen Actors Guild Award is an accolade given by the Screen Actors Guild‐American Federation of Television and Radio Artists (SAG-AFTRA) to recognize outstanding performances in film and primetime television.

Critics' Choice Awards
The Critics' Choice Awards—both film and television—are accolades presented by the Broadcast Film Critics Association (BTJA) (US).

Satellite Awards
The Satellite Awards are annual awards given by the International Press Academy that are commonly noted in entertainment industry journals and blogs.

People's Choice Awards
The People's Choice Awards is an American awards show, recognizing the people and the work of popular culture, voted on by the general public.

References

Notes

External links 

 
 
 
 

20th-century American actresses
21st-century American actresses
Actresses from New York City
American Shakespearean actresses
American child actresses
American film actresses
American stage actresses
American television actresses
Best Drama Actress Golden Globe (television) winners
Best Miniseries or Television Movie Actress Golden Globe winners
Dalton School alumni
Lee Strasberg Theatre and Film Institute alumni
People from Greenwich Village
Living people
Lycée Français de Los Angeles alumni
Outstanding Performance by a Lead Actress in a Drama Series Primetime Emmy Award winners
Outstanding Performance by a Lead Actress in a Miniseries or Movie Primetime Emmy Award winners
Outstanding Performance by a Female Actor in a Drama Series Screen Actors Guild Award winners
Outstanding Performance by a Female Actor in a Miniseries or Television Movie Screen Actors Guild Award winners
Yale College alumni
1979 births